The Fairmount Water Works in Philadelphia, Pennsylvania, was Philadelphia's second municipal waterworks. Designed in 1812 by Frederick Graff and built between 1812 and 1872, it operated until 1909, winning praise for its design and becoming a popular tourist attraction. It now houses a restaurant and an interpretive center that explains the waterworks' purpose and local watershed history. It was designated a National Historic Landmark in 1976 for its architecture and its engineering innovations.  It was the nation's first water supply to use paddle wheels to move water.

History
Following a series of yellow fever epidemics in the late 18th century (which was at the time thought to be caused by unclean water or by rotting matter in the streets) city leaders appointed a "Watering Committee".  The initial water system was designed by Benjamin Latrobe and accepted by the committee in 1799. His system utilized two steam engines (in series) to pump water from the Schuylkill River, into the city, then into two wooden tanks that held a total of just .  From the wooden tanks, the water was gravity fed into a series of wooden water mains.  The system was plagued with problems.  If either of the steam engines failed, the water supply to the city was cut off.

The committee began searching for another solution and eventually picked John Davis and Frederick Graff (Latrobe's apprentice and successor as chief engineer) to design a new waterworks, in order to meet the demand of the increasing numbers of city residents and to solve the problem of inadequate storage capacity.

The Fairmount Water Works was initially constructed between 1812 and 1815 on the east bank of the Schuylkill River. The Water Works initially consisted of a  earthen reservoir atop Faire Mount (now site of the Philadelphia Museum of Art), and a pump house with two steam engines to pump water.  Between 1819 and 1821, a  dam was built across the Schuylkill to direct water to a Mill House with three water wheels that replaced the steam engines in 1822. Later, Jonval turbines were used to lift the water in a New Mill House and in the renovated Old Mill House.

The facility, the industrial nature of which was disguised by a Classical Revival exterior, became a tourist attraction for its beauty and its location on the riverside. Visitors included Charles Dickens, who praised it for its pleasant design and public usefulness. Another English visitor, Fanny Trollope, in her 1832 book Domestic Manners of the Americans, mentioned the Water Works:

There is one spot, however, about a mile from the town, which presents a lovely scene. The water-works of Philadelphia have not yet perhaps as wide extended fame as those of Marley, but they are not less deserving it. At a most beautiful point of the Schuylkill River the water has been forced up into a magnificent reservoir, ample and elevated enough to send it through the whole city. The vast yet simple machinery by which this is achieved is open to the public, who resort in such numbers to see it, that several evening stages run from Philadelphia to Fair Mount for their accommodation.

The Fairmount Water Works eventually closed in 1909 when several newer and more technologically updated facilities were built.

Fairmount Dam
Completed in 1822, Fairmount Dam cut diagonally across the river, channeled water into the Waterworks, and acted as a spillway. The Schuylkill is a tidal river, so it also prevented brackish water in the Delaware River from mixing with the fresh water. Above it, the dam created the "Schuylkill Pond", several miles of tranquil water used for recreation.

Present day

After the waterworks closed in 1909 the facility was used for several purposes, including the Philadelphia Aquarium (which closed in 1962) and an indoor swimming pool which closed in 1973. In more recent years attempts have been made to return the waterworks to its previous position as an engaging tourist attraction. Despite a severe fire which caused setbacks to the restoration, an interpretive center has now been added and tours are regularly given. Its position near Boathouse Row and the Philadelphia Museum of Art is hoped to aid in making it a regularly visited tourist site once more.

The Fairmount Water Works buildings now house the Fairmount Water Works Interpretive Center (FWWIC), a hands-on science and environmental educational center, created by the Philadelphia Water Department. The FWWIC offers interactive exhibits, lectures, events, and school programs.

In December 2004, Michael Karloutsos won a 25-year, $120,000/year lease with the Fairmount Park Commission. After a highly publicized renovation, Karloutsos opened Water Works Restaurant and Lounge within the Water Works on July 20, 2006.

See also

 Fairmount Park
 List of crossings of the Schuylkill River
 List of National Historic Landmarks in Philadelphia
 List of tourist attractions in Philadelphia
 Louis Wernwag
 National Register of Historic Places in North Philadelphia
 Schuylkill Canal

References

External links

 Fairmont Water Works: 1800–1860 from American Studies at the University of Virginia
  Water Works Restaurant
 The Fairmount Water Works by Jane Mork Gibson
 Water for the City
 
 Fairmount Water Works at the Historical Marker Database

Buildings and structures on the National Register of Historic Places in Philadelphia
Infrastructure completed in 1872
National Historic Landmarks in Pennsylvania
Water supply infrastructure on the National Register of Historic Places
Schuylkill River
Museums in Philadelphia
Industry museums in Pennsylvania
Historic American Engineering Record in Philadelphia
Industrial buildings and structures on the National Register of Historic Places in Pennsylvania
Philadelphia Register of Historic Places
East Fairmount Park
Fairmount, Philadelphia
Former pumping stations
Historic Mechanical Engineering Landmarks